The Wind (1925), a supernatural novel by Dorothy Scarborough, depicts the loneliness of life in a small Texas town during the 1880s. She originally published it anonymously, anticipating a rough reception in Texas. It was later made into a film called The Wind (1928) starring Lilian Gish.

According to Texas folklorist J. Frank Dobie, this novel "excited the wrath of chambers of commerce and other boosters in West Texas--a tribute to its realism."

The Handbook of Texas online says of the work: This last, controversial, novel, in which a gentle heroine is driven insane by the incessant wind and drought-plagued frontier environment, has assured her reputation as an American regional novelist. The book created a furor in Texas when it was published because of its negative portrayal of frontier living conditions on the cattle ranges around Sweetwater in the 1880s. The book was also published anonymously as a publicity ploy. Today, however, many critics regard this novel as a Texas classic, notable for its characterization of a tragic heroine driven to murder and insanity.

Film adaptation
It has been adapted once, in 1928, directed by Victor Sjöström and starring Lillian Gish. The film notably changed the novel's ending, with Letty not going insane from the wind and her murder of Wirt, having conquered her fear of the wind and wanting to stay with her husband.

Publication details
1925, US, Harper & Brothers (ISBN NA), pub date ? ? 1925, hardback (first edition)
1925, UK, Harper & Brothers (ISBN NA), pub date ? ? 1925, hardback
1979, US, University of Texas Press, pub date March 1979, hardback and paperback
1986, US, University of Texas Press, pub date August 1986, paperback (reprint ed)

See also
Prairie madness

References

External links
 
 

1925 American novels
Texas literature
Western (genre) novels
American novels adapted into films
Novels set in Texas
Novels set in the 1880s
Works published anonymously
Harper & Brothers books